is a passenger railway station in located in the city of Katano, Osaka Prefecture, Japan, operated by West Japan Railway Company (JR West).

Lines

Station layout
The station has two opposed ground-level side platforms connected by an underground passage. The station has a Midori no Madoguchi staffed ticket office.

Platforms

Adjacent stations

History
The station was opened on 2 December 1935. 

Station numbering was introduced in March 2018 with Kawachi-Iwafune being assigned station number JR-H30.

Passenger statistics
In fiscal 2019, the station was used by an average of 11,069 passengers daily (boarding passengers only).

Surrounding area
 Kawachimori Station on the Keihan Katano Line is about 300m south of the station
Katano City Health and Welfare Center
 "Ikiiki Land Katano" (Municipal General Gymnasium) 
 Osaka Prefectural Katano High School

References

External links

Official home page 

Railway stations in Japan opened in 1935
Railway stations in Osaka Prefecture
Katano, Osaka